The Ramova Theater is a historic movie theater at 3508-3518 South Halsted Street in the Bridgeport neighborhood of Chicago, Illinois. Businessman Jokūbas Maskoliūnas, one of the many Lithuanian immigrants who settled in Bridgeport in the early twentieth century, built the theater in 1929. The theater opened with 1,300 seats, making it the largest in the neighborhood, and was built with a commercial block and apartments in the same building. Its name, which was chosen by the winner of a local newspaper contest, means "peaceful place" or "serene place" in Lithuanian. Architect Myer O. Nathan designed the building as an atmospheric theater, a style of theater meant to transplant audiences to a distant place or time; in the case of the Ramova, its interior used false fronts and balconies to resemble a Spanish courtyard. Nathan's design included elements of Neoclassical and Spanish Revival architecture, such as extensive terra cotta ornamentation, a frieze spanning the length of the building, and plaster detailing on the interior.

The theater was added to the National Register of Historic Places on December 17, 2021.

References

External links

Theatres on the National Register of Historic Places in Chicago
Theatres completed in 1929
Atmospheric theatres
Neoclassical architecture in Illinois
Spanish Revival architecture in Illinois